Professor Azim Nanji is a Kenyan-born professor of Islamic studies. From 1998 until 2008, he served as Director of The Institute of Ismaili Studies in London, England. At present, he is the Senior Associate Director of the Abbasi Program in Islamic Studies at Stanford University. He is also on the Board of Directors of the Global Centre for Pluralism a joint partnership between His Highness the Aga Khan and the Government of Canada.

Biography
Born in Nairobi, Kenya, Professor Nanji attended schools in Kenya, Tanzania, and Makerere University in Uganda, and received his master's and doctoral degrees in Islamic Studies from McGill University, Canada.

Dr. Nanji has held academic and administrative appointments at various American and Canadian universities. Until 1998, he was a Professor and Chair of the Department of Religion at the University of Florida. Since that time he has been with the Institute of Ismaili Studies, a research institute which aims to promote scholarship and learning of Muslim cultures and societies, with a view towards attaining a better understanding of Islam and its relationship with other societies and faiths.

In 1988 he was Margaret Gest Visiting Professor at Haverford College, Pennsylvania, USA, and a Visiting Professor at Stanford University, California in 2004, where he was also invited to give the Baccalaureate Address in 1995.

Professor Nanji has served as Co-Chair of the Islam section at the American Academy of Religion and on the editorial board of the Academy's Journal. He has also been a member of the Philanthropy Committee of the Council on Foundations and has been the recipient of awards from the Rockefeller Foundation, the Canada Council, and the National Endowment for the Humanities. In 2004 he gave the Birks Lecture at McGill University.

Within the Aga Khan Development Network, Professor Nanji has served as a member of the Steering Committee and Master Jury of the Aga Khan Award for Architecture, and as a task force member for the Institute for the Study of Muslim Civilizations (AKU-ISMC), and continues as Vice Chair of the Madrasa-based Early Childhood Education Programme in East Africa.

Publications
Professor Nanji has authored, co-authored and edited several books including: 
The Nizari Ismaili Tradition (1976),
The Muslim Almanac (1996),
Mapping Islamic Studies (1997)
The Historical Atlas of Islam (with M. Ruthven) (2004)

In addition, he has contributed numerous shorter studies and articles on religion, Islam and Ismailism in journals and collective volumes including the Encyclopædia of Islam, Encyclopædia Iranica, Oxford Encyclopædia of the Modern Islamic World, and A Companion to Ethics. He is also the Associate Editor for the revised Second Edition of The Encyclopaedia of Religion. As of 2007, he is preparing a Historical Dictionary of Islam to be published by Penguin.

References

External links
 1995 Baccalaureate Address at Stanford University 
 2004 Birks Lecture at McGill University
 The Great Lecture Library
 

Kenyan Ismailis
Kenyan emigrants to the United Kingdom
Stanford University staff
British Islamic studies scholars
Makerere University alumni
McGill University Institute of Islamic Studies alumni
Year of birth missing (living people)
Living people
Kenyan people of Asian descent